The Marvin College Boys Dormitory and President's House, in Clinton, Kentucky, was listed on the National Register of Historic Places.  The listing includes two contributing buildings, at 404 and 416 N. Washington St.

The president's house was built in 1899–1900;  the dormitory was built in 1910.  The dormitory was later used as Hotel Jewell.The two buildings are the only surviving buildings of Marvin College.

See also 
 Clinton College (Kentucky): Also in Clinton, Kentucky
 National Register of Historic Places listings in Hickman County, Kentucky

References

National Register of Historic Places in Hickman County, Kentucky
Houses completed in 1900
1900 establishments in Kentucky
University and college buildings on the National Register of Historic Places in Kentucky
University president residences
Residential buildings completed in 1910
1910 establishments in Kentucky
University and college dormitories in the United States
Residential buildings on the National Register of Historic Places in Kentucky